Ultra-high-definition television (also known as Ultra HD television, Ultra HD, UHDTV, UHD and Super Hi-Vision) today includes 4K UHD and 8K UHD, which are two digital video formats with an aspect ratio of 16:9. These were first proposed by NHK Science & Technology Research Laboratories and later defined and approved by the International Telecommunication Union (ITU).

In 2015, the Ultra HD Forum was created to bring together the end-to-end video production ecosystem to ensure interoperability and produce industry guidelines so that adoption of ultra-high-definition television could accelerate. From just 30 in Q3 2015, the forum published a list up to 55 commercial services available around the world offering 4K resolution.

The "UHD Alliance", an industry consortium of content creators, distributors, and hardware manufacturers, announced during a Consumer Electronics Show (CES) 2016 press conference its "Ultra HD Premium" specification, which defines resolution, bit depth, color gamut, high dynamic range (HDR) performance required for Ultra HD (UHDTV) content and displays to carry their Ultra HD Premium logo.

Alternative terms
Ultra-high-definition television is also known as Ultra HD, UHD, UHDTV and 4K. In Japan, 8K UHDTV will be known as Super Hi-Vision since Hi-Vision was the term used in Japan for HDTV. In the consumer electronics market companies had previously only used the term 4K at the 2012 CES but that had changed to "Ultra HD" during CES 2013. "Ultra HD" was selected by the Consumer Electronics Association after extensive consumer research, as the term has also been established with the introduction of "Ultra HD Blu-ray".

Technical details

Resolution
Two resolutions are defined as UHDTV:

 UHDTV-1 is 3840 pixels wide by 2160 pixels tall (8.3 megapixels), which is four times as many pixels as the  (2.07 megapixels) of current 1080p HDTV (full HDTV).
 Also known as 2160p, and 4K UHD. Although roughly similar in resolution to 4K digital cinema formats, it should not be confused with other 4K resolutions such as the  DCI 4K/Cinema 4K. The total number of pixels of RGB stripe type is 8.3 megapixels.
 UHDTV-2 is 7680 pixels wide by 4320 pixels tall (33.18 megapixels), also referred to as 4320p and 8K UHD, which is sixteen times as many pixels as current 1080p HDTV, which brings it closer to the detail level of 15/70 mm IMAX. NHK advertises the 8K UHDTV format with 22.2 surround sound as Super Hi-Vision.

Color space, dynamic range, frame rate and resolution/aliasing
The human visual system has a limited ability to discern improvements in resolution when picture elements are already small enough or distant enough from the viewer. At some home viewing distances and current TV sizes, HD resolution is near the limits of resolution for the eye and increasing resolution to 4K has little perceptual impact, if consumers are beyond the critical distance (Lechner distance) to appreciate the differences in pixel count between 4K and HD. One exception is that even if resolution surpasses the resolving ability of the human eye, there is still an improvement in the way the image appears due to higher resolutions reducing spatial aliasing.

UHDTV provides other image enhancements in addition to pixel density. Specifically, dynamic range and color are greatly enhanced, and these impact saturation and contrast differences that are readily resolved greatly improve the experience of 4KTV compared to HDTV. UHDTV allows the future use of the new Rec. 2020 (UHDTV) color space which can reproduce colors that cannot be shown with the current Rec. 709 (HDTV) color space.

In terms of CIE 1931 color space, the Rec. 2020 color space covers 75.8%, compared to coverage by the DCI-P3 digital cinema reference projector color space of just 53.6%, 52.1% by Adobe RGB color space, while the Rec. 709 color space covers only 35.9%. UHDTV's increases in dynamic range allow not only brighter highlights but also increased detail in the greyscale. UHDTV also allows for frame rates up to 120 frames per second (fps).

UHDTV potentially allows Rec. 2020, higher dynamic range, and higher frame rates to work on HD services without increasing resolution to 4K, providing improved quality without as high of an increase in bandwidth demand.

History

2001–2005

The first displays capable of displaying 4K content appeared in 2001, as the IBM T220/T221 LCD monitors.

NHK researchers built a UHDTV prototype which they demonstrated in 2003. They used an array of 16 HDTV recorders with a total capacity of almost 3.5TB that could capture up to 18 minutes of test footage. The camera itself was built with four  CCDs, each with a resolution of only . Subsequently, an improved and more compact system was built using CMOS image sensor technology and the CMOS image sensor system was demonstrated at Expo 2005, Aichi, Japan, the NAB 2006 and NAB 2007 conferences, Las Vegas, at IBC 2006 and IBC 2008, Amsterdam, Netherlands, and CES 2009. A review of the NAB 2006 demo was published in a broadcast engineering e-newsletter. Individuals at NHK and elsewhere projected that the timeframe for UHDTV to be available in domestic homes varied between 2015 and 2020 but Japan was to get it in the 2016 time frame.

2006–2010
On November 2, 2006, NHK demonstrated a live relay of a UHDTV program over a 260 kilometer distance by a fiber-optic network. Using dense wavelength division multiplex (DWDM), 24Gbit/s speed was achieved with a total of 16 different wavelength signals.

On December 31, 2006, NHK demonstrated a live relay of their annual Kōhaku Uta Gassen over IP from Tokyo to a  screen in Osaka. Using a codec developed by NHK, the video was compressed from 24Gbit/s to 180600Mbit/s and the audio was compressed from 28Mbit/s to 728Mbit/s. Uncompressed, a 20-minute broadcast would require roughly 4 TB of storage.

The SMPTE first released Standard 2036 for UHDTV in 2007. UHDTV was defined as having two levels, called UHDTV1 and UHDTV2.

In May 2007, the NHK did an indoor demonstration at the NHK Open House in which a UHDTV signal ( at 60fps) was compressed to a 250Mbit/s MPEG2 stream. The signal was input to a 300MHz wide band modulator and broadcast using a 500MHz QPSK modulation. This "on the air" transmission had a very limited range (less than 2 meters), but shows the feasibility of a satellite transmission in the 36,000km orbit.

In 2008, Aptina Imaging announced the introduction of a new CMOS image sensor specifically designed for the NHK UHDTV project. During IBC 2008 Japan's NHK, Italy's RAI, BSkyB, Sony, Samsung, Panasonic Corporation, Sharp Corporation, and Toshiba (with various partners) demonstrated the first ever public live transmission of UHDTV, from London to the conference site in Amsterdam.

On June 9, 2010, Panasonic announced that its professional plasma display lineup would include an  plasma display with 4K resolution. At the time of announcement, it was the largest 4K display and the largest television.

On September 29, 2010, the NHK partnered up and recorded The Charlatans live in the UK in the UHDTV format, before broadcasting over the internet to Japan.

2011
On May 19, 2011, Sharp in collaboration with NHK demonstrated a direct-view  LCD display capable of  pixels at 10 bits per channel. It was the first direct-view Super Hi-Vision-compatible display released.

Before 2011, UHDTV allowed for frame rates of 24, 25, 50, and 60fps. In an ITU-R meeting during 2011, an additional frame rate was added to UHDTV of 120fps.

2012
On February 23, 2012, NHK announced that with Shizuoka University they had developed an 8K sensor that can shoot video at 120fps.

In April 2012, Panasonic, in collaboration with NHK announced a  display ( at 60fps), which has 33.2 million 0.417mm square pixels.

In April 2012, the four major South Korean terrestrial broadcasters (KBS, MBC, SBS, and EBS) announced that in the future, they would begin test broadcasts of UHDTV on channel 66 in Seoul. At the time of the announcement, the UHDTV technical details had not yet been decided. LG Electronics and Samsung are also involved in UHDTV test broadcasts.

In May 2012, NHK showed the world's first ultra-high-definition shoulder-mount camera. By reducing the size and weight of the camera, the portability had been improved, making it more maneuverable than previous prototypes, so it could be used in a wide variety of shooting situations. The single-chip sensor uses a Bayer color-filter array, where only one color component is acquired per pixel. Researchers at NHK also developed a high-quality up-converter, which estimates the other two color components to convert the output into full resolution video.

Also in May 2012, NHK showed the ultra-high-definition imaging system it has developed in conjunction with Shizuoka University, which outputs 33.2-megapixel video at 120fps with a color depth of 12bits per component. As ultra-high-definition broadcasts at full resolution are designed for large, wall-sized displays, there is a possibility that fast-moving subjects may not be clear when shot at 60fps, so the option of 120fps has been standardized for these situations. To handle the sensor output of approximately 4 billion pixels per second with a data rate as high as 51.2Gbit/s, a faster analog-to-digital converter has been developed to process the data from the pixels, and then a high-speed output circuit distributes the resulting digital signals into 96 parallel channels. This  CMOS sensor is smaller and uses less power when compared to conventional ultra-high-definition sensors, and it is also the world's first to support the full specifications of the ultra-high-definition standard.

During the 2012 Summer Olympics in Great Britain, the format was publicly showcased by the world's largest broadcaster, the BBC, which set up 15-meter-wide screens in London, Glasgow, and Bradford to allow viewers to see the Games in ultra-high definition.

On May 31, 2012, Sony released the VPL-VW1000ES 4K 3D Projector, the world's first consumer-prosumer projector using the 4K UHDTV system, with the shutter-glasses stereoscopic 3D technology priced at US$24,999.99.

On August 22, 2012, LG announced the world's first 3D UHDTV using the 4K system.

On August 23, 2012, UHDTV was officially approved as a standard by the International Telecommunication Union (ITU), standardizing both 4K and 8K resolutions for the format in ITU-R Recommendation BT.2020.

On September 15, 2012, David Wood, Deputy Director of the EBU Technology and Development Department (who chairs the ITU working group that created Rec. 2020), told The Hollywood Reporter that South Korea plans to begin test broadcasts of 4K UHDTV next year. Wood also said that many broadcasters have the opinion that going from HDTV to 8K UHDTV is too much of a leap and that it would be better to start with 4K UHDTV. In the same article, Masakazu Iwaki, NHK Research senior manager, said that the NHK plan to go with 8K UHDTV is for economic reasons since directly going to 8K UHDTV would avoid an additional transition from 4K UHDTV to 8K UHDTV.

On October 18, 2012, the Consumer Electronics Association (CEA) announced that it had been unanimously agreed by the CEA's Board of Industry Leaders that the term "Ultra High-Definition", or "Ultra HD", would be used for displays that have a resolution of at least 8 megapixels with a vertical resolution of at least 2,160 pixels and a horizontal resolution of at least 3,840 pixels. The Ultra HD label also requires the display to have an aspect ratio of 16:9 or wider and to have at least one digital input that can carry and present a native video signal of  without having to rely on a video scaler. Sony announced they would market their 4K products as 4K Ultra High-Definition (4K UHD).

The LCD panel is designed for medical equipment and professional video equipment.

The LG 84LM9600 is an  flat panel LED-backlit LCD display with a price of US$19,999 though the retail store was selling it for US$16,999.

On November 29, 2012, Sony announced the 4K Ultra HD Video Player—a hard disk server preloaded with ten 4K movies and several 4K video clips that they planned to include with the Sony XBR-84X900. The preloaded 4K movies are The Amazing Spider-Man, Total Recall (2012), The Karate Kid (2010), Salt, Battle: Los Angeles, The Other Guys, Bad Teacher, That's My Boy, Taxi Driver, and The Bridge on the River Kwai. Additional 4K movies and 4K video clips will be offered for the 4K Ultra HD Video Player in the future .

On November 30, 2012, Red Digital Cinema Camera Company announced that they were taking pre-orders for the US$1,450 REDRAY 4K Cinema Player, which can output 4K resolution to a single 4K display or to four 1080p displays arranged in any configuration via four HDMI1.4 connections. Video output can be DCI 4K, 4K Ultra HD, 1080p, and 720p at frame rates of up to 60fps with a color depth of up to 12bpc with 4:2:2 chroma subsampling. Audio output can be up to 7.1 channels. Content is distributed online using the ODEMAX video service. External storage can be connected using eSATA, Ethernet, USB, or a Secure Digital memory card.

2013
On January 6, 2013, the NHK announced that Super Hi-Vision satellite broadcasts could begin in Japan in 2016.

On January 7, 2013, Eutelsat announced the first dedicated 4K Ultra HD channel. Ateme uplinks the H.264/MPEG-4 AVC channel to the EUTELSAT 10A satellite. The 4K Ultra HD channel has a frame rate of 50fps and is encoded at 40Mbit/s. The channel started transmission on January 8, 2013. On the same day Qualcomm CEO Paul Jacobs announced that mobile devices capable of playing and recording 4K Ultra HD video would be released in 2013 using the Snapdragon 800 chip.

The BCM7445 is a 28nm ARM architecture chip capable of 21,000 Dhrystone MIPS with volume production estimated for the middle of 2014. On the same day THX announced the "THX 4K Certification" program for Ultra HD displays. The certification involves up to 600 tests and the goal of the program is so that "content viewed on a THX Certified Ultra HD display meets the most exacting video standards achievable in a consumer television today".

On January 14, 2013, Blu-ray Disc Association president Andy Parsons stated that a task force created three months ago is studying an extension to the Blu-ray Disc specification that would add support for 4K Ultra HD video.

On January 25, 2013, the BBC announced that the BBC Natural History Unit would produce Survival—the first wildlife TV series recorded in 4K resolution. This was announced after the BBC had experimented with 8K during the London Olympics.

On January 27, 2013, Asahi Shimbun reported that 4K Ultra HD satellite broadcasts would start in Japan with the 2014 FIFA World Cup. Japan's Ministry of Internal Affairs and Communications decided on this move to stimulate demand for 4K Ultra HD TVs.

On February 21, 2013, Sony announced that the PlayStation 4 would support 4K resolution output for photos and videos but wouldn't render games at that resolution.

On March 26, 2013, the Advanced Television Systems Committee (ATSC) announced a call for proposals for the ATSC 3.0 physical layer that specifies support for  resolution at 60fps.

On April 11, 2013, Bulb TV created by Canadian entrepreneur Evan Kosiner became the first broadcaster to provide a 4K linear channel and VOD content to cable and satellite companies in North America. The channel is licensed by the Canadian Radio-Television and Telecommunications Commission to provide educational content.

On April 19, 2013, SES announced the first Ultra HD transmission using the HEVC standard.

On May 9, 2013, NHK and Mitsubishi Electric announced that they had jointly developed the first HEVC encoder for 8K Ultra HD TV, which is also called Super Hi-Vision (SHV). The HEVC encoder has 17 3G-SDI inputs and uses 17 boards for parallel processing with each board encoding a row of  pixels to allow for real time video encoding. The HEVC encoder is compliant with draft 4 of the HEVC standard and has a maximum bit rate of 340Mbit/s. The HEVC encoder was shown at the NHK Science & Technology Research Laboratories Open House 2013 that took place from 30 May to June 2.

On May 21, 2013, Microsoft announced the Xbox One, which supports 4K resolution video output and 7.1 surround sound. Yusuf Mehdi, corporate vice president of marketing and strategy for Microsoft, has stated that there is no hardware restriction that would prevent Xbox One games from running at 4K resolution.

On May 30, 2013, Eye IO announced that their encoding technology was licensed by Sony Pictures Entertainment to deliver 4K Ultra HD video.

In mid-2013, a Chinese television manufacturer produced the first 50-inch UHD television set costing less than $1,000.

On June 11, 2013, Comcast announced that they had demonstrated the first public U.S.-based delivery of 4K Ultra HD video at the 2013 NCTA show. The demonstration included segments from Oblivion, Defiance, and nature content sent over a DOCSIS 3.0 network.

On June 13, 2013, ESPN announced that they would end the broadcast of the ESPN 3D channel by the end of that year and would "...experiment with things like UHDTV."

On June 26, 2013, Sharp announced the LC-70UD1U, which is a  4K Ultra HD TV. The LC-70UD1U is the world's first TV with THX 4K certification.

On July 2, 2013, Jimmy Kimmel Live! recorded in 4K Ultra HD a performance by musical guest Karmin, and the video clip was used as demonstration material at Sony stores.

On July 3, 2013, Sony announced the release of their 4K Ultra HD Media Player with a price of US$7.99 for rentals and US$29.99 for purchases. The 4K Ultra HD Media Player only worked with Sony's 4K Ultra HD TVs.

On July 15, 2013, the CTA published CTA-861-F, a standard that applies to interfaces such as DVI, HDMI, and LVDS. The CTA-861-F standard adds support for several Ultra HD video formats and additional color spaces.

On September 2, 2013 Acer announced the first smartphone, dubbed Liquid S2, capable of recording 4K video.

On September 4, 2013, the HDMI Forum released the HDMI 2.0 specification, which supports 4K resolution at 60fps. On the same day, Panasonic announced the Panasonic TC-L65WT600—the first 4K TV to support 4K resolution at 60FPS. The Panasonic TC-L65WT600 has a  screen, support for DisplayPort1.2a, support for HDMI2.0, an expected ship date of October, and a suggested retail price of US$5,999.

On September 12–17, 2013, at the 2013 IBC Conference in Amsterdam, Nagra introduced an Ultra HD User Interface called Project Ultra based on HTML5, which works with OpenTV 5.

On October 4, 2013, DigitalEurope announced the requirements for their UHD logo in Europe. The DigitalEurope UHD logo requires that the display support a resolution of at least , a  aspect ratio, the Rec. 709 (HDTV) color space, 8bpc color depth, a frame rate of 24, 25, 30, 50, or 60fps, and at least 2-channel audio.

On October 29, 2013, Elemental Technologies announced support for real-time 4K Ultra HD HEVC video processing. Elemental provided live video streaming of the 2013 Osaka Marathon on October 27, 2013, in a workflow designed by K-Opticom, a telecommunications operator in Japan. Live coverage of the race in 4K Ultra HD was available to viewers at the International Exhibition Center in Osaka. This transmission of 4K Ultra HD HEVC video in real-time was an industry-first.

On November 28, 2013, Organizing Committee of the XXII Olympic Winter Games and XI Paralympic Winter Games 2014 in Sochi chief Dmitri Chernyshenko stated that the 2014 Olympic Winter Games would be shot in 8K Super Hi-Vision.

On December 25, 2013, YouTube added a "2160p 4K" option to its videoplayer. Previously, a visitor had to select the "original" setting in the video quality menu to watch a video in 4K resolution. With the new setting, YouTube users can much more easily identify and play 4K videos.

On December 30, 2013, Samsung announced availability of its  Ultra HDTV for custom orders, making this the world's largest Ultra HDTV so far.

2014
On January 22, 2014, European Southern Observatory became the first scientific organization to deliver Ultra HD footage at regular intervals.

On May 6, 2014, France announced DVB-T2 tests in Paris for Ultra HD HEVC broadcast with objectives to replace by 2020 the current DVB-T MPEG4 HD national broadcast.

On May 26, 2014, satellite operator Eutelsat announced the launch of Europe's first Ultra HD demo channel in HEVC, broadcasting at 50fps. The channel is available on the Hot Bird satellites and can be watched by viewers with 4K TVs equipped with DVB-S2 demodulators and HEVC decoders.

In June 2014, the FIFA World Cup of that year (held in Brazil) became the first shot entirely in 4K Ultra HD, by Sony. The European Broadcasting Union (EBU) broadcast matches of the FIFA World Cup to audiences in North America, Latin America, Europe and Asia in Ultra HD via SES' NSS-7 and SES-6 satellites. Indian satellite TV provider unveils its plan to launch 4K UHD service early in 2015 and showcased live FIFA World Cup quarter final match in 4K UHD through Sony Entertainment Television Sony SIX.

On June 24, 2014, the CEA updated the guidelines for Ultra High-Definition and released guidelines for Connected Ultra High-Definition, adding support for internet video delivered with HEVC. The CEA is developing a UHD logo for voluntary use by companies that make products that meet CEA guidelines. The CEA also clarified that "Ultra High-Definition", "Ultra HD", or "UHD" can be used with other modifiers and gave an example with "Ultra High-Definition TV 4K".

On July 15, 2014, Researchers from the University of Essex both captured and delivered its graduation ceremonies in 4K UHDTV over the internet using H.264 in realtime. The 4K video stream was published at 8Mbit/s and 14Mbit/s for all its 11 ceremonies, with people viewing in from countries such as Cyprus, Bulgaria, Germany, Australia, UK, and others.

On September 4, 2014, Canon Inc. announced that a firmware upgrade would add Rec. 2020 color space support to their EOS C500 and EOS C500 PL camera models and their DP-V3010 4K display.

On September 4, 2014, Microsoft announced a firmware update for the Microsoft Lumia 1020, 930, Icon, and 1520 phones that adds 4K video recording. The update was later released by the individual phone carriers over the following weeks and months after the announcement.

On September 5, 2014, the Blu-ray Disc Association announced that the 4K Blu-ray Disc specification supports 4K video at 60fps, High Efficiency Video Coding, the Rec. 2020 color space, high dynamic range, and 10bpc color depth. 4K Blu-ray Disc will have a data rate of at least 50Mbit/s and may include support for 66GB and 100GB discs. 4K Blu-ray Disc began licensing in 2015, with 4K Blu-ray Disc players released late that year.

On September 5, 2014, DigitalEurope released an Ultra HD logo for companies that meet their technical requirements.

On September 11, 2014 satellite operator SES announced the first Ultra HD conditional access-protected broadcast using DVB standards at the IBC show in Amsterdam. The demonstration used a Samsung Ultra HD TV, with a standard Kudelski SmarDTV CI Plus conditional access module, to decrypt a full  pixel CAS-protected Ultra HD signal in HEVC broadcast via an SES Astra satellite at 19.2°E.

On November 19, 2014, rock band Linkin Park's concert at Berlin's O2 World Arena was broadcast live in Ultra HD via an Astra 19.2°E satellite. The broadcast was encoded in the UHD 4K standard with the HEVC codec (50fps and a 10bpc color depth), and was a joint enterprise of satellite owner SES, SES Platform Services (later MX1, now part of SES Video) and Samsung.

2015
Indian satellite pay TV provider Tata Sky launched UHD service and UHD Set Top Box on 9 January 2015. The service is 4K at 50fps and price of the UHD box is ₹5900 for existing SD/HD customers and ₹6400 for new customers. The Cricket World Cup 2015 was telecast live in 4K for free to those who own Tata Sky's UHD 4K STB.

In May 2015, France Télévisions broadcast matches from Roland Garros live in Ultra HD via the EUTELSAT 5 West A satellite in the HEVC standard. The channel "France TV Sport Ultra HD" was available via the Fransat platform for viewers in France.

In May 2015, satellite operator SES announced that Europe's first free-to-air Ultra HD channel (from Germany's pearl.tv shopping channel) would launch in September 2015, broadcast in native Ultra HD via the Astra 19.2°E satellite position.

In June, SES launched its first Ultra HD demonstration channel for cable operators and content distributors in North America to prepare their systems and test their networks for Ultra HD delivery. The channel is broadcast from the SES-3 satellite at 103°W.

In June, SPI International previewed its "4K FunBox UHD" Ultra HD channel on the HOT BIRD 4K1 channel, in advance of its commercial launch on Eutelsat's HOT BIRD satellites in the autumn.

In July 2015, German HD satellite broadcaster HD+ and TV equipment manufacturer TechniSat announced an Ultra HD TV set with integrated decryption for reception of existing HD+ channels (available in the Autumn) and a new Ultra HD demonstration channel due to begin broadcasting in September.

On 2 August 2015, The FA Community Shield in England was broadcast in Ultra HD by broadcast company BT Sport, becoming the first live  football game shown in  Ultra HD on the world's first commercial Ultra HD channel. The match was shown on Europe's first Ultra HD channel, BT Sport Ultra HD where selected live English Premier League and European Champions League matches were broadcast

Fashion One 4K launched on September 2, 2015 becoming the first global Ultra HD TV channel. Reaching nearly 370 million households across the World, the fashion, lifestyle and entertainment network broadcasts via satellite from Measat at 91.5°E (for Asia Pacific, Middle East, Australia) and from SES satellites Astra 19.2°E (for Europe), SES-3 at 103°W (for North America), NSS-806 at 47.5°W (for South America).

In September 2015, Eutelsat presented new consumer research, conducted by TNS and GfK, on Ultra HD and screen sales in key TV markets. The study looked at consumer exposure to Ultra HD, perceived benefits and willingness to invest in equipment and content. GfK predicts a 200% increase in Ultra HD screen sales from June to December 2015, with sales expected to reach five million by the end of the year. GfK also forecasts that Ultra HD screens in 2020 will represent more than 70% of total sales across Europe and almost 60% in the Middle East and North Africa.

On 2 September 2015, Sony unveiled the Xperia Z5 Premium; the first smartphone with a 4K display.

On 9 September 2015, Apple Inc. announced that their new smartphone the iPhone 6S could record video in 4K.

On 6 October 2015, Microsoft unveiled the latest version of their Microsoft Surface Book laptop with a display of "over 6 million pixels" and their new phones the Microsoft Lumia 950 and 950 XL, which, aside from 4K video recording that their predecessors included, feature a display of "over 5 million pixels".

On 8 December 2015, the ceremony of the opening of the Holy Door in Vatican City, which marked the beginning of the Jubilee Year of Mercy in the Roman Catholic church, was the first worldwide Ultra HD broadcast via satellite. The event was produced by the Vatican Television Center with the support of Eutelsat, Sony, Globecast and DBW Communication. The team did some advanced experimentation with 4K/High Dynamic Range live images and in particular using technology developed by the BBC's R&D division and Japan's public broadcaster NHK in terms of Hybrid Log Gamma (HLG) signals.

2016
The "UHD Alliance", an industry consortium of content creators, distributors, and hardware manufacturers, announced Monday on January 11, 2016 during CES 2016 press conference its "Ultra HD Premium" specification, which defines resolution, bit depth, color gamut, high dynamic range (HDR) performance required for Ultra HD (UHDTV) content and displays to carry their Ultra HD Premium logo.

On April 2, 2016, Ultra-high-definition television demo channel UHD1 broadcast the Le Corsaire ballet in Ultra HD live from the Vienna State Opera. The programme was produced by Astra satellite owner, SES in collaboration with European culture channel ARTE, and transmitted free-to-air, available to anyone with reception of the Astra 19.2°E satellites and an ultra HD screen equipped with an HEVC decoder.

As of April 2016, The NPD Group reported that 6 million 4K UHD televisions had been sold.

In May 2016, Modern Times Group, owner of the Viasat DTH platform announced the launch of Viasat Ultra HD, the first UHD channel for the Nordic region. The channel features selected live sport events especially produced in Ultra HD and launch in the autumn via the SES-5 satellite at 5°E. Viasat is also launching an Ultra HD set-top box from Samsung and a TV-module that enables existing UHD TVs to display the channel. Satellite operator, SES said that the launch of Viasat Ultra HD brings the number of UHD channels (including test channels and regional versions) carried on SES satellites to 24, or 46% of all UHD channels broadcast via satellite worldwide. In August 2016, Sky announced that 4K broadcasts would begin via their new Sky Q 2TB box. The opening match of the 2016-17 Premier League between Hull City and Leicester City on Sky Sports was the first 4K transmission.

2017
On 29 September 2017, BSAT-4a, dedicated for UHDTV programming and was also claimed "the world's first 8K satellite", was launched from the Guiana Space Centre aboard Ariane 5 rocket. BSAT-4a would be used for 2020 Summer Olympics held in Japan.

Additionally, in September 2017, Kaleidescape, a manufacturer of home-theater movie players and servers made 4K UHD movies compatible with their movie store, and with their movie players.

In December 2017, Qualcomm announced that their Snapdragon 845 chipset and Spectra 280 Image Signal Processor would be the first phone SoC to record video in UHD Premium.

2018
In April 2018, RTL started broadcasting its own UHD channel in Germany. First available at Astra 19.2°E, the Channel shows UHD productions, Formula 1, Football and Deutschland sucht den Superstar.

Satellite operator SES broadcast an 8K television signal via its satellite system for the first time in May 2018. The 8K demonstration content, with a resolution of  pixels, a frame rate of 60fps, and 10bpc color depth, was encoded in HEVC and transmitted at a rate of 80Mbit/s via the Astra 3B satellite during SES's Industry Days conference in Luxembourg.

In June 2018, fuboTV broadcast the 2018 FIFA World Cup live in 4K and HDR10 becoming the first OTT streaming service to do so. Quarter, Semi and Final matches were available on many popular streaming devices including Apple TV, Chromecast Ultra, Fire TV, Roku and Android TVs. Content was streamed at 60 frames per second using HLS and DASH. Video was sent in fragmented MP4 containers delivering HEVC encoded video.

On December 1, 2018, NHK launched BS8K, a broadcast channel transmitting at 8K resolution.

2019
In May 2019, for the first time in Europe, 8K demonstration content was received via satellite without the need for a separate external receiver or decoder. At the 2019 SES Industry Days conference at Betzdorf, Luxembourg broadcast quality 8K content (with a resolution of  pixels at 50fps) was encoded using a Spin Digital HEVC encoder (at a bit rate of 70Mbit/s), uplinked to a single 33MHz transponder on SES' Astra 28.2°E satellites and the downlink received and displayed on a Samsung  Q950RB production model TV.

List of 4K television channels

Global
 Fashion 4K
 Festival 4K
 High 4K TV

Europe

4K Heritage
 4K UltraHD FunBox
4K Universe
Astra Promo
 BBC TV (UK)
 beIN Sports 4K (Spain)
 BT Sport Ultimate
 Canal+
Canal+ 4K Ultra HD (Poland)
Digi 4K (Romania)
 Digiturk UHD
 Discovery
 Eurosport 4K
Fashion One 4K
 Fashion TV 4K
 Festival 4K
Insight UHD
 M3.hu UHD (online only)
 Movistar Fórmula 1 UHD
 Movistar Partidazo UHD
 NASA TV
 NPO 1
 Pearl TV
 ProsiebenSat.1 UHD
 QVC Deutschland
 QVC Zwei
 Rai 4K
 RMC Sport 1
 RTL UHD
 RTVS UltraHD
 SES Ultra HD Demo Channel
 SFR Sport 4K
 Sky Sport 4K (Italy)
 Sky UHD1 (UK)
 Sky UHD2 (UK)
 Sky Sport UHD (Germany)
 Sky Sport Bundesliga UHD (Germany)
Sky Sports Main Event UK
 Sportklub 4K
 Sport TV 4K UHD
 Travelxp
 Tricolor Ultra HD
 TRT 4K
 TVP 4K (Poland)
 UHD-1
 V Sport Ultra HD
 Viasat Ultra HD
 Virgin TV Ultra HD
Wow! 4K

Africa
 BTV (Botswana)
E BS 4K (Ethiopia)
Nahoo sports+UHD (Ethiopia)
Nahoo sports+2 UHD  (Ethiopia)
ETV sports UHD (Ethiopia) 
Kana TV 4K (Ethiopia)
on Time sports HD (Egypt)

Americas

 NASA TV UHD
 Sportsnet 4K and Sportsnet One 4K (Canada)
 TSN 4K and TSN 2 4K (Canada)
 Hispasat TV 4K (Latin America)
 Fashion One 4K
 Fox Sports 4K and Fox Sports 1 4K (USA)
 DirecTV 4K and DirecTV Cinema 4K (USA)
 ESPN (USA)
 4KUNIVERSE
 Insight UHD
 The Country Network
 Rede Globo (Brazil)
 UHD-1

Asia

 CCTV 4K
 Guangdong Radio and Television 4K Variety Channel
 Guangzhou Television Ultra HD
 SiTV Joy UHD
 Wasu-Discovery UHD
 Beijing TV Winter Olympic & Documentaries UHD
 First Media 4K (Indonesia)
 IndiHome 4K (Indonesia)
 Cable 4K
 KBS1 UHD
 KBS2 UHD
 MBC UHD
 SBS UHD
 KNN UHD
 KBC UHD
 TBC UHD
 TJB UHD
 UBC UHD
 G1 UHD
 Asia UHD (South Korea)
 Insight UHD
 Life U
 SBS F!L UHD
 IRIB UHD Iran
 Sky UHD
 UHD Dream TV
 UMAX
 UXN
 4K-Sat
 Tata Sky 4K (India)
 Now Sports 4K (Hong Kong)
 Bol Network Pakistan
 Hum News Pakistan
 Kan11 4K (Israel)
 NHK BS 4K (Japan)
 BS Nittele 4K (Japan)
 BS Asahi 4K (Japan)
 BS TV Tokyo 4K (Japan)
 BS-TBS 4K (Japan)
 BS Fuji 4K (Japan)
 SHOP CHANNEL 4K (Japan)
 4K QVC (Japan)
 THE CINEMA 4K (Japan)
 J Sports (Japan)
 Star Channel 4K (Japan)
 Sukachan 4K (Japan)
 Japanese movie + Jidaigeki 4K
 Wowow 4K (Japan)
 Astro Super Sport UHD (Malaysia)
 True 4K (Thailand)
 VTVcab 4K (Vietnam)
 SCTV 4K (Vietnam)

Oceania
 Foxtel Movies Ultra HD (Australia)
 Fox Sports Ultra HD (Australia)

List of 8K television channels 
BS Fuji 8K (Japan)
NHK BS8K (Japan)
CCTV-8K (China)

Field trials of UHDTV over DTT networks
Field trials using existing digital terrestrial television (DTT) transmitters have included the following.

Status of standardization of UHDTV
Standards that deal with UHDTV include:

Standardization in ITU-R
Standards approved in ITU-R:
 Rec. ITU-R BT.1201-1 (2004)
 Rec. ITU-R BT.1769 (2006)
 Rec. ITU-R BT.2020 (2012, revised 2014)
 Rec. ITU-R BT.2035-0 (07/13) A reference viewing environment for evaluation of HDTV program material or completed programmes
 Rec. ITU-R BS.2051-0 (02/14) Advanced sound system for programme production
 Rec. ITU-R BT.2100 (2016)
Other documents prepared or being prepared by ITU-R:
 Report ITU-R BT.2246-3 (2014) The present state of ultra-high definition television
 Draft New Report ITU-R BT.[UHDTV-DTT TRIALS] (Sub-Working Group 6A-1) Collection of field trials of UHDTV over DTT networks

Standardization in ITU-T and MPEG
Standards developed in ITU-T's VCEG and ISO/IEC JTC 1's MPEG that support Ultra-HD include:
 H.265/MPEG-H HEVC High Efficiency Video Coding (2013, revised 2014)
 H.264/MPEG-4 AVC Advanced Video Coding (support for Ultra-HD added circa 2013)

Standardization in SMPTE
 SMPTE 2036-1 (2009)
 SMPTE 2036-2 (2008)
 SMPTE 2036-3 (2010)

Standardization for Europe
DVB approved the Standard TS 101 154 V2.1.1, published (07/2014) in the DVB Blue Book A157 Specification for the use of Video and Audio Coding in Broadcasting Applications based on the MPEG-2 Transport Stream, which was published by ETSI in the following months.

Standardization for Japan and South Korea
Standards for UHDTV in South Korea have been developed by its Telecommunications Technology Association.

On August 30, 2013, the scenarios for 4K-UHDTV service were described in the Report "TTAR 07.0011: A Study on the UHDTV Service Scenarios and its Considerations".

On May 22, 2014, the technical report "TTAR-07.0013: Terrestrial 4K UHDTV Broadcasting Service" was published.

On October 13, 2014, an interim standard – "TTAI.KO-07.0123: Transmission and Reception for Terrestrial UHDTV Broadcasting Service" – was published based on HEVC encoding, with MPEG 2 TS, and DVB-T2 serving as the standards.

On June 24, 2016, a standard – "TTAK.KO-07.0127: Transmission and Reception for Terrestrial UHDTV Broadcasting Service" – was published based on HEVC encoding, with MMTP/ROUTE IP, and ATSC 3.0 serving as the standards.

See also
 Rec. 2020 – ITU-R Recommendation for UHDTV
 4K resolution – Resolutions of common 4K formats and list of 4K-monitors, TVs, projectors
 8K resolution – Specifications for ~8x4K UHD and 8Kx8K fulldome
 Ultra HD Blu-ray –  2160p / 4K (3840 × 2160 resolution) format Blu-ray Disc as specified by Blu-ray Disc Association
 IMAX – A film theater format that historically has been innovative in creating a more realistic viewing experience
 High Efficiency Video Coding (HEVC)
 VP9 / WebM
 22.2 surround sound – The audio component of Super Hi-Vision

Notes

References

External links

 4K TV Mag – an online magazine about Ultra HD TV
 "What is 4K Ultra HD?" – 4K TV Mag

 
Consumer electronics
Digital television
Film and video technology
History of television
Telecommunications-related introductions in 2003
Television technology
Television terminology
Video formats